John William Barkley Landers (August 13, 1892 – March 24, 1975) was an American Negro league pitcher in the 1910s.

A native of Scottsville, Kentucky, Landers played for the Indianapolis ABCs in 1917. He died in Columbus, Ohio in 1975 at age 82.

References

External links
Baseball statistics and player information from Baseball-Reference Black Baseball Stats and Seamheads

1892 births
1975 deaths
Indianapolis ABCs players
Baseball pitchers
Baseball players from Kentucky
People from Scottsville, Kentucky
20th-century African-American sportspeople